Miss Universe Philippines 2020 was the first edition of the Miss Universe Philippines competition under its new organization. Previously, the Philippine franchise for Miss Universe was under Binibining Pilipinas Charities, Inc. The coronation night was initially scheduled for May 3, 2020. However, due to the COVID-19 pandemic, it moved at least twice; first to June 14, 2020, and later to October 25, 2020, at the Cordillera Convention Hall, Baguio Country Club in Baguio, Benguet, Philippines.

The final competition was broadcast on GMA Network. Gazini Ganados of Talisay, Cebu, the winner of Binibining Pilipinas 2019, crowned Rabiya Mateo of Iloilo City as her successor at the end of the event, with a new crown called "Filipina". Mateo represented the Philippines at the Miss Universe 2020 pageant and finished as a Top 21 semifinalist.

Background

New franchise
The new Miss Universe Philippines franchise was awarded to Shamcey Supsup-Lee, national director. Supsup was the Philippines' representative to the Miss Universe 2011 pageant where she placed 3rd Runner-Up. It marked the first time in the history of the Miss Universe Philippines franchise that contestants will be allowed to communicate in local Philippine languages other than Filipino.

Selection of participants
In December 2019, the organization launched its search for the next Filipina who would represent the Philippines at the Miss Universe 2020 competition. On February 14, 2020, the 52 contestants of Miss Universe Philippines 2020 were presented during the Red Carpet Presentation at Manila Hotel.

Location and date
On January 29, 2020, the organization announced that the coronation will be held on May 3, 2020 at the Mall of Asia Arena in Pasay, Metro Manila, Philippines. However, due to the COVID-19 pandemic, it was rescheduled twice; first to June 14, 2020, and later to October 25, 2020, at the Cordillera Convention Hall, Baguio Country Club in Baguio, Benguet, Philippines.

Impact of the COVID-19 pandemic
The procedures for the organization of the pageant was impacted by the COVID-19 pandemic due to the enhanced community quarantines in the country. The Miss Universe Philippines organization released new guidelines entitled "2020 Pageant Way Forward".

It was originally planned that the contestants would be divided into smaller groups for the preliminaries which involved the swimsuit and evening gown competition. All should wear masks except their individual turns on the competition stage and each contestant was obligated to go home after her respective turn. Due to the impact of the COVID-19 pandemic, the date and venue for the preliminary competition was moved. The preliminary competition was filmed at the Baguio Country Club in Baguio, Benguet. Worldwide audience was able to watch the preliminary interview on October 21 and national costume, swimsuit, and evening gown competition on October 23 through a streaming service offered by the organizer. It was hosted by Benjamin Alves.

The finals night was originally planned to be held at the Mall of Asia Arena in Pasay, Metro Manila, but the venue was changed due to the pandemic. Under the assumption that the pageant would be held in a large venue as there would be no audiences allowed under the guidelines of Inter-Agency Task Force for the Management of Emerging Infectious Diseases (IATF-EID) through health and safety protocols. The MUP organization projected less than 100 people would be needed, including the contestants, judges, and production team with social distancing implemented. Most production materials for the pageant would be pre-taped. The finals night would be made available to the public online via pay-per-view streaming.

Contestants representing Sorsogon and Cagayan de Oro withdrew from the competition after they tested positive for COVID-19.

Marketing
An eight-episode web series entitled Ring Light was released on September 27 on Empire.ph and could be viewed for a one-time fee. Marketed as a "fundraising online pageant series", part of the proceeds would be given to the pageants' beneficiaries and partner organizations. The series featured several aspects of the pageant's contestants bid to clinch the Miss Universe Philippines 2020 crown, including their trainings and other behind-the-scenes content.

"Filipina" crown
A new crown was used to award the winner of the Miss Universe Philippines pageant for the 2020 edition. The headwear is known as the "Filipina" crown and was crafted by the Villarica family, who is known for running the Villarica Pawnshop.

Each element of the crown represents the following:

 Swirl of leaves – every women who aims for success in "different forms" but still keeps "the Filipino values in their hearts".
 Diamond embedded in each leaf – signifies "the sparkle" in the lives of people that each woman encounters.
 Golden south sea pearls – four values of creativity, intelligence, optimism, and fear of God.
 Sapphire, Ruby and Topaz – was patterned after the blue, red, and yellow colors of the Philippine flag

Results

Placements

§ – Lazada Fan Vote Winner

Major awards

Special awards

Pageant

Preliminary competition
The preliminary competition was filmed at the Baguio Country Club in Baguio, Benguet. Worldwide audience was able to watch the preliminary interview on October 21 and national costume, swimsuit, and evening gown competition on October 23 through a streaming service offered by the organizer. It was hosted by Benjamin Alves.

Judges 
 Mary Jean Lastimosa – Miss Universe Philippines 2014
 Katrina Salonga Verzosa – Owner and founder of the Verzosa Aesthetic Clinic.
 Maria Venus Raj – Miss Universe Philippines 2010
 Ariella Arida – Miss Universe Philippines 2013
 Jackie Aquino – General manager of JCA Productions and the president of Philippine Fashion Coalition
 Samuel Salonga Verzosa Jr. – Co-founder and CEO of Frontrow
 Neil Perez – Mister International 2014

Final program
The coronation night was filmed at Baguio Country Club and streamed on October 25 worldwide. It was hosted by American radio DJ and actor KC Montero. American Idol alum Jessica Sanchez and Filipino actors Allen Cecilio, Anjo Damiles, and Kevin Montillano performed as musical guests.

The swimwear for the finals was designed by UAE-based couture label Amato Couture by Filipino designer Furne One in collaboration with luxury swimwear Amari Swim.

Two questions were asked in the question-and-answer portion for the Top 5 candidates; the first being unique to each candidate and the second question was answered by all five candidates. The second question was related to the COVID-19 pandemic, which has been noted to have shifted priorities, and where does pageants in general stand at the moment.

Judges 
 RS Francisco – Actor and co-founder of Frontrow
 Eric Yap – Representative of ACT-CIS Partylist and Legislative Caretaker of the Lone District of Benguet
 Harry Roque – Lawyer and Presidential Spokesperson
 Jackie Aquino – General manager of JCA Productions and the president of Philippine Fashion Coalition
 Venus Navalta – CEO of IPG Mediabrands Philippines
 Janine Tugonon – Miss Universe Philippines 2012
 Arlene Magalong – Wife of the mayor of Baguio
 Arthur Peña – Group Director for Media of Procter & Gamble Philippines
 Samuel Salonga Verzosa Jr. – Co-founder and CEO of Frontrow

Contestants
46 delegates competed for the title.

Duties of winners
The Miss Universe Philippines Organization designated focus of duties to each winners.

Notes

Withdrawals
 Princess Marquez of Aurora – On October 19, 2020, Marquez confirmed her withdrawal due to some personal reasons.
 Vincy Vacalares of Cagayan de Oro – On October 16, 2020, an accredited partner of Miss Universe Philippines announced that Vacalares tested positive for COVID-19.
 Mariam Lara Hamid of Capiz – On October 3, 2020, Hamid posted on her social media account declaring her withdrawal due to some issues with her province's accredited partner.
 Chaira Lyn Markwalder of Leyte
 Angela Aninang of Negros Occidental – On February 28, 2020, it was confirmed that Aninang will be withdrawing from the pageant to focus on her study. 
 Maria Isabela Galeria of Sorsogon – On October 15, 2020, Galeria announced that she will be leaving the competition as she continue her full recovery from COVID-19 after contracting the disease on September 27.

References

External links

Question and Answer transcripts – Top 16 and Top 5 from Rappler

2020 beauty pageants
2020 in the Philippines
Beauty pageants in the Philippines
Events postponed due to the COVID-19 pandemic
History of Baguio
GMA Network television specials
2020